Kendriya Vidyalaya, Charbatia is a school run by Kendriya Vidyalaya Sangathan and located in Charbatia Air Base, Cuttack, Odisha. It provides education to the children of both Central Government employees and civilians, from nearby areas. The school is affiliated to the Central Board of Secondary Education and the medium of instruction is English and Hindi.

The school offers classes from grades I to XII (primary to senior secondary). The school is divided into Primary Classes (Class I to V) and Secondary Classes (sub-divided into Junior Group – Class VI to VIII and Senior Group – Class IX to XII). The Senior Secondary section offers Science and Arts (Humanities) streams. The school conducts co-curricular activities by grouping students into four school houses: Shivaji, Tagore, Ashok and Raman.

Sports and games 
Sports take place:
 Within the Vidyalaya between Houses
 Between two or more Vidyalayas at the cluster level
 Between clusters at the regional level
 Between region at the national level

Course Offered

Primary Classes
Class I to Class V
 English
 Hindi
 Environmental Studies (EVS)
 Mathematics

Secondary classes
Junior Classes (Class VI to VIII)
 English (including Supplementary)
 Hindi (including Supplementary)
 Social Science (including Political Science, Geography and History)
 Science 
 Mathematics 
 Sanskrit
Senior Classes (Class IX to X)
 English Communicative
 Hindi/Sanskrit (choose any one subject among the two subjects)
 Social Science (including Political Science, Geography, History and Economics)
 Science 
 Mathematics

Others
 Art and Crafts 
 Sports 
 Yoga and Meditation
 NCC (National Cadet Corps – which is eligible for Class 8 students) started in 2008
 Scouts and Guides

See also 

Kendriya Vidyalaya
List of Kendriya Vidyalayas
List of schools in Odisha

External links
Kendriya Vidyalaya Sangathan
Directory of Schools List in India States

Education in Cuttack
High schools and secondary schools in Odisha
Kendriya Vidyalayas
Primary schools in India
Educational institutions established in 1984
1984 establishments in Orissa